James E. Moore was an associate justice of the South Carolina Supreme Court. Moore was born on March 13, 1936, in Laurens, South Carolina. He attended Duke University both as an undergraduate student and as a law student. Justice James E. Moore was elected to the Supreme Court of South Carolina on May 29, 1991 (and was sworn in on December 30, 1991) and re-elected to a ten-year term on May 6, 1998.

References

1936 births
Living people
People from Laurens, South Carolina
Duke University alumni
Duke University School of Law alumni
Justices of the South Carolina Supreme Court